This List of Haverford College people includes alumni and faculty of Haverford College. Haverford is a smaller college and has a smaller alumni population than its peers. Because expansion occurred in the 1980s, most of Haverford's alumni are still quite young. Despite this, as of 2010, Haverford alumni include 5 Nobel Prize laureates, 4 MacArthur Fellows, 20 Rhodes Scholarship recipients, 10 Marshall Scholarship recipients, 9 Henry Luce Fellows, 56 Watson Fellows, 2 George Mitchell Scholarship, 2 Churchill Scholars, 1 Gates Cambridge Scholar, 13 All Americans, and 23 NCAA post-graduate winners.

Alumni

Business and industry
Iwao Ayusawa Japanese labour relations author
Emily Best '02, founder of crowdfunding platform Seed&Spark
Josh Byrnes '92, senior vice president of baseball operations, Los Angeles Dodgers
William S. Halstead '26, inventor in national and international communication; held more than 80 patents in radio and television development
Alex Karp '89, billionaire co-founder and CEO of Palantir Technologies
Michael Kim '85, billionaire co-founder and partner of MBK Partners 
James Kuo '86, bio-medical entrepreneur; CEO of BioMicro Systems
Andrew L. Lewis, Jr. '53, former chairman and CEO of Union Pacific Corporation
Gerald M. Levin '60, former Time Warner Inc. Chief Executive Officer
Eugene Ludwig '68, chairman and CEO of Promontory Financial Group; former U.S. Comptroller of the Currency
Howard Lutnick '83, billionaire chairman and CEO of the Cantor Fitzgerald Company
Robert MacCrate '43, Sullivan & Cromwell Vice Chairman; legal education reformer
J. Howard Marshall '26, Texan billionaire oil tycoon who married Anna Nicole Smith in his late 80s
Tony Petitti '83, CEO of MLB Network
Jane Silber '85, CEO of Canonical, maintainers of the Ubuntu operating system
Ken Stern '85, former CEO of NPR
Arn Tellem '76, principal, Management Wasserman Media Group
John C. Whitehead '43, former co-chairman of Goldman Sachs, deputy U.S. Secretary of State in the Reagan administration and later chairman of Lower Manhattan Development Corporation; namesake of Whitehead Campus Center
Barry Zubrow '75, former chief risk officer at JP Morgan Chase; former chief administrative officer at Goldman Sachs

Higher education and academia
Carl B. Allendoerfer '34, mathematician and former chair of University of Washington mathematics department
Anthony Amsterdam '57, MacArthur Fellow, university professor of law, NYU
Robert Bates '64, Eaton Professor of Science of Government, Harvard University
Terry Belanger '63, 2005 MacArthur Fellow, university professor and director of Rare Book School, University of Virginia
Douglas C. Bennett '68, former provost of Reed College, and former president of Earlham College
Thomas J. Christensen '84, interim dean of School of International and Public Affairs, Columbia University
Tristram Potter Coffin '43, former professor of English and founder of the Folklore department at the University of Pennsylvania
Steven Drizin, lawyer and law professor at the Northwestern University Pritzker School of Law
Stephen G. Emerson '74, director of the Herbert Irving Comprehensive Cancer Center at New York-Presbyterian Hospital/Columbia University Medical Center and Clyde ’56 & Helen Wu Professor in Immunology, Columbia University College of Physicians and Surgeons and former president, Haverford College (2007–2011)
Joan Gabel ‘88, provost of University of South Carolina
Peter Bacon Hales '72, professor of art history and director of the American Studies Institute at the University of Illinois at Chicago
Akira Iriye '57, professor of history at Harvard University, president of American Historical Society
Fredric Jameson '54, Marxist cultural and literary critic, William A. Lane Professor of Comparative Literature and Romance Studies at Duke University
Walter Kaegi '59, scholar of Byzantine history and professor of history at the University of Chicago
Lauren Kassell, professor of history of science and medicine at the University of Cambridge
Christoph M. Kimmich '61, former president of Brooklyn College
Mark A.R. Kleiman '72, 1951-2019, professor of public policy at NYU, previously of UCLA, Harvard, criminal justice and drug policy expert, blogger 
Douglas Koshland '76, professor of molecular and cellular biology at University of California, Berkeley
Bruce Lincoln '70, author of Holy Terrors; professor at the University of Chicago Divinity School
Stephen J. Lippard '62, Arthur Amos Noyes Professor of Chemistry at the Massachusetts Institute of Technology
George Marsden '59, Francis A. McAnaney Professor of History at the University of Notre Dame (1992–2008), winner of the Bancroft Prize and Merle Curti Award for Jonathan Edwards: A Life
Marc Melitz '89, professor of economics, Harvard College
George Mosse '41, University of Wisconsin - Madison  John C. Bascom Professor of European History and Weinstein-Bascom Professor of Jewish Studies, concurrently holding the Koebner Professorship of History at Hebrew University; first research historian in residence at the United States Holocaust Memorial Museum
Ken Nakayama '62, Edgar Pierce Professor of Psychology, Harvard University
Adam Zachary Newton '80, professor of English, Yeshiva University
Cletus Odia Oakley, mathematician and chairman of Haverford Math Department (1942 - 1964)
Frank J. Popper '65, Professor at the Edward J. Bloustein School of Planning and Public Policy of Rutgers University and the Princeton Environmental Institute at Princeton University; known for proposing the Buffalo Commons and coining the term "locally unwanted land use" (LULU)
Hunter R. Rawlings III '66 Classics, 10th president of Cornell University 1995–2003 (made interim president again in 2005), former president of University of Iowa
Fred Rodell '26, LL.D. '73; professor, 1933–1973, at Yale Law School; proponent of legal realism
Charles Coleman Sellers '25, librarian at Dickinson College and Bancroft Prize-winning biographer and historian
Edward A. Shanken '86, University of Amsterdam, author of Art and Electronic Media
Ed Sikov '78, film scholar and author of Mr. Strangelove: A Biography of Peter Sellers and On Sunset Boulevard: The Life and Times of Billy Wilder
Jonathan Z. Smith '60, historian of religion, University of ChicagoEric Tagliacozzo '89, professor of Southeast Asian history, Cornell University
Joseph H. Taylor '63, former dean of faculty, of physics Princeton University, Nobel Laureate ‘93 in Physics
David Thornburgh '81, executive director, Fels Institute of Government at the University of Pennsylvania (2008–present)
Louis Round Wilson attended 1895-98, academic librarian at the University of North Carolina; founder of the University of North Carolina Press; founder of the library science school at the University of Chicago; president of the American Library Association

Entertainment, fine and performing arts
David Scull Bispham 1876, baritone; Metropolitan Opera and Covent Garden soloist; author of A Quaker Singer's Recollection, 1920
William Carragan 1958, musicologist noted for his work on Anton Bruckner, and for contributions to physics
Chevy Chase, ex-'66, attended for one semester, comedian and actor
Vincent Desiderio, artist
Andy Gavin, video game programmer, entrepreneur
Robert E. Hecht 1941, collector, dealer and expert in antiquities
Mark Hudis 1990, former co-executive producer of True Blood, former writer and co-executive producer of Nurse Jackie, former executive producer of That '70s ShowHarlan Jacobson 1971, film critic, lecturer and author
Julius Katchen 1947, concert pianist, recognized by Eugene Ormandy at his debut concert playing Mozart's Piano Concerto in D-Minor (age 10)
Daniel Dae Kim 1990, film and stage actor; Hawaii Five-0, Lost, The Andromeda Strain; holds an MFA from the Graduate Acting Program at New York University's Tisch School of the Arts; winner of Screen Actors Guild Awards for Lost and Crash; named one of the "Sexiest Men Alive" in 2005 by People magazine
Ken Ludwig 1972, Tony Award-winning playwright of Lend Me a Tenor and Crazy for You and a lawyer (of counsel) for Steptoe & Johnson LLP
Judd Nelson ex-'82, actor, did not graduate
Craig Owens 1971, art critic and theorist
Maxfield Parrish (attended 1888–1891), painter, illustrator
Rand Ravich 1984, writer, director, and producer
Henry Richardson 1983, artist, designed Connecticut 9/11 memorial
Mark Schatz 1978, musician, dancer, and music producer
George Segal ex-'55, actor, attended
Sigmund Spaeth 1905 (D.H.L. (Hon.) 1965), musicologist, composer, radio personality, known as The Tune DetectiveGregory Whitehead 1978, audio artist, media philosopher, award-winning radio playwright and documentary producer
David Whiting 1968, journalist and manager of actress Sarah Miles
Alfred Grossman 1948, writer and novelist.
Tobias Iaconis 1993, screenwriter

Government, diplomacy, and law
Richard G. Andrews '77, judge, U.S. District Court for the District of Delaware
Thomas Barlow '62, former Democratic member of Congress from Kentucky
Gary Born '78, international arbitrator and partner, Wilmer Cutler Pickering Hale and Dorr LLP
Robert Braucher '36, former Associate Justice, Massachusetts Supreme Judicial Court
Charles Canady '76, former Republican member of Congress; Florida Supreme Court Justice; coined the term "partial-birth abortion"
Ron Christie '91, former special assistant to President George W. Bush and deputy assistant to Vice President Dick Cheney
Richard M. Cooper '64, Rhodes Scholar, former chief counsel for Food and Drug Administration, partner at Williams & Connolly LLP
Henry S. Drinker, Jr. 1900, 1949 Litt.D. (Hon.), managing partner and namesake of Drinker Biddle & Reath law firm (now Faegre Drinker); counsel to University of Pennsylvania; musicologist and chamber music enthusiast; ethics scholar 
Harold Evans 1907, 1968 LL.D. (Hon.), Philadelphia lawyer, active in AFSC, U.N.-appointed first mayor of Jerusalem (1948), argued before Supreme Court in Hirabayashi v. United States (1943)
Mark Geragos '79, defense attorney for Winona Ryder and Michael Jackson
Peter J. Goldmark '67, Washington State Commissioner of Public Lands
Oscar Goodman '61, former Mayor of Las Vegas, former criminal defense attorney
David F. Hamilton ’79, Judge, U.S. Court Appeals for the Seventh Circuit
Lawson Harvey 1877, Justice of the Indiana Supreme Court
Fritz Kaegi, '93, Democrat, current Cook County Assessor, IL
Indya Kincannon '93, Mayor of Knoxville, TN
Mark D. Levine '91, New York City Councilmember
Andrew Lewis '53, former CEO Union Pacific, Secretary of Transportation under President Ronald Reagan
Kermit Lipez ‘63, Judge, U.S. Court of Appeals for the First Circuit
Eugene Ludwig '68, former US Comptroller of the Currency, partner of Covington & Burling LLP
Robert MacCrate '43, Sullivan & Cromwell Vice Chairman and legal education reformer
Charles Mathias '44, former Republican Congressman and Senator from Maryland
Koichiro Matsuura '61 Economics, former Japanese Ambassador to France, 1999-now, director-general of UNESCO
Jim Moody '67, former Democratic member of Congress from Wisconsin
Philip Noel-Baker, Baron Noel-Baker 1908, Nobel Laureate (1959); member of the Parliament of the United Kingdom; chairman of the British Labour Party; architect of the League of Nations; Olympian and captain of Great Britain's Chariots of Fire Olympic track team
Jeffrey B. Pine '76, Attorney General of Rhode Island 1993–1999
Stephen H. Sachs '54, lawyer; former Attorney General of Maryland; US Attorney for the District of Maryland, where he prosecuted the Catonsville Nine
Rob Simmons '65, former Republican Congressman of Connecticut 
Christopher Van Hollen '47, former United States Ambassador to Sri Lanka and the Maldives from 1972 to 1976
Bruce H. Andrews '90, former Deputy Secretary of Commerce in the Obama administration

Journalism
John Carroll 1963, former executive vice president and editor of The Los Angeles Times; first Knight Visiting Lecturer at Harvard's Shorenstein Center
Dirck Halstead 1958, photojournalist
Adi Ignatius 1981, editor-in-chief of Harvard Business ReviewHarlan Jacobson 1971, film critic and former editor-in-chief of Film Comment Magazine Annie Karni 2004, White House reporter for Politico
Joshua Kurlantzick 1998, journalist and author, special correspondent for The New RepublicStanley Kurtz 1975, conservative commentator
Allen Lewis 1940, Philadelphia Inquirer baseball writer, inductee into writers' wing of National Baseball Hall of Fame
Josh Mankiewicz 1977, correspondent for Dateline NBCFelix Morley 1915, journalist and author; editor 1933–1940 of Washington Post; winner of 1936 Pulitzer Prize for "distinguished editorial writing during the year"
Robert Neuwirth 1981, philosophy, author of Shadow Cities: A Billion Squatters, A New Urban WorldMichael Paulson 1986, theater reporter, religion reporter for New York Times; city editor for Boston Globe, co-winner 2003 Pulitzer Prize for public service, for coverage of sexual abuse scandal in Catholic archdiocese; four-time winner, Wilbur Award for religion writing
Norman Pearlstine 1964, former editor-in-chief of Time Inc.; chief content officer of 'Bloomberg L.P., senior advisor at the Carlyle Group; former managing editor of The Wall Street Journal; former executive editor of Los Angeles Times
David Wessel 1975, Wall Street Journal, National Public Radio economics correspondent
Juan Williams 1976 philosophy, Fox News Channel senior correspondent

Literature and writing
Lloyd Alexander (attended ca. 1940, did not graduate), Newbery Medal-winning author
Nicholson Baker 1979, novelist, winner of the National Book Critics Circle Award
Dave Barry '69 English, Pulitzer Prize–winning humor columnist
John Dickson Carr '29, author of detective stories; also published under the pen names Carter Dickson, Carr Dickson and Roger Fairbairn
Frank Conroy '58, author, late director of the Iowa Writers Workshop
Robert Flynn, 1990, editor in chief of Getty Publications
Roy Gutman '66, Pulitzer Prize-winning journalist, author
Colin Harrison, 1982 author, editor to numerous prominent authors, and editor-in-chief for Scribners. 
Evan Jones '49, poet, playwright, and screenwriter
Richard Lederer '59, author known for books on wordplay and the English language
Stephen W. Meader 1913, author of over forty novels for young readers
Christopher Morley 1910, novelist, poet, essayist, Rhodes scholar
Norman Pearlstine '64, former editor-in-chief of Time magazine; chief content officer at Bloomberg L.P.
Logan Pearsall Smith attended 1881–1884, man of letters, author of TriviaMedicine
Andrew E. Budson '88, neurologist, researcher, Associate Director of the Boston University Alzheimer's Disease Research Center
Tom Farley '77, M.D., M.P.H., formerly Commissioner of Health, Cities of New York and Philadelphia
David R. Gastfriend '76, psychiatrist, addiction treatment researcher, and former CEO of the Treatment Research Institute
Alan Gerry, chair of orthopedic surgery, Harvard Medical School
William H. Harris '49, orthopedic surgery pioneer; namesake of the Harris Hip Score
Jon Kabat-Zinn '64, mindfulness meditation
Raymond Rocco Monto '82, orthopedic surgeon, researcher, writer; winner of the 2012 Jacques Duparc EFORT research award, president of Nantucket Cottage Hospital
Kari Nadeau '88, allergy expert; director of the Nadeau Laboratory at Stanford University School of Medicine
Joel Selanikio ’86 Sociology, pediatrician, epidemiologist, social entrepreneur, technologist; winner of the 2005 Haverford College award, and 2009 Lemelson-MIT award for sustainability in 2009, for his work in creating technology for global health; named by Forbes magazine in 2009 as one of nine most powerful innovators; former adviser to Tommy Thompson' former Secretary of Health and Human Services
James Tyson 1860, dean of University of Pennsylvania School of Medicine

Science
Roger Bacon (physicist) '51 Physics, inventor of carbon fiber in 1958
James Dahlberg '62, professor emeritus of biomolecular chemistry, University of Wisconsin–Madison
Stephen J. Lippard '62, Arthur Amos Noyes Professor of Chemistry, MIT
George Smith '63, winner of the Nobel Prize in Chemistry in 2018, Curators’ Distinguished Professor Emeritus of Biological Sciences at the University of Missouri
 Michael J. Weber '63, Director of the University of Virginia Cancer Center and co-discoverer of MAP Kinase
Theodore William Richards class of 1885, Nobel laureate (Chemistry, 1914), first American to win a Nobel in Chemistry
Joseph Hooton Taylor, Jr. '63 Physics, Nobel laureate (Physics, 1993), Dean of Faculty at Princeton University
Philip M. Whitman class of 1937, mathematician, solved the word problem for free lattices
Frank Eugene Lutz class of 1900. The leading entomologist in the first half of the 19th century. Curator at American Museum of Natural History 1909-1943. Developed first nature trail in the United States. Educational trail. Author of several books and pamphlets.

Social action, philanthropy, and community service
Henry J. Cadbury 1903, 1933 Litt.D. (Hon.) Nobel Peace Prize winner and founder of American Friends Service Committee (AFSC)
Norman Hill 1956, civil rights activist, Black labor leader
Rufus Jones 1885, 1922 LL.D. (Hon.), author, philosopher and founder of the American Friends Service Committee
Howard Thurman c. 1930 (special student), African-American theologian and preacher, pacifist and social activist, co-founder of Fellowship of Reconciliation and of the Church for the Fellowship of All Peoples

Sports and athletics
Josh Byrnes '92, senior vice president of baseball operations, San Diego Padres; former general manager of the Arizona Diamondbacks
Thad Levine '94, general manager of the Minnesota Twins
Philip Noel-Baker, Baron Noel-Baker 1908, ran for Great Britain in the Olympic games in 1912, 1920 (silver medalist at 1500 meters), and 1924; team captain at the Paris games, and the team's exploits were made famous as the Chariots of Fire Olympic track team
Karl Paranya '97, first NCAA Division III runner to run a sub-four minute mile and world record holder in the indoor 4x800 relay race
Tony Petitti '83, chief operating officer, Major League Baseball and former president and chief executive officer, MLB Network
Stephen Ridings '17, professional baseball pitcher for the New York Yankees
Ronald M. Shapiro '64, attorney and sports agent, Shapiro Sher Guinot & Sandler;past clients include Hall of Famers Cal Ripken, Jr., Jim Palmer, Brooks Robinson, Kirby Puckett, and Eddie Murray
Arn Tellem '76, attorney and sports agent; clients have included Tracy McGrady, Jason Giambi, and Pau Gasol

Fictional alumni
Dale Cooper, FBI detective in David Lynch's Twin PeaksAstrid Farnsworth, FBI agent in FringePresidents of Haverford College

Notable current and former faculty
Richard J. Bernstein, professor of philosophy (1966–1989); author of John Dewey (1966); Dean of Graduate Studies, New School of Social Research
Lynne Butler, professor of mathematics and statistics
Curt Cacioppo, professor of music; contemporary composer
Roberto Castillo-Sandoval, associate professor of Spanish; Chilean author
John Royston Coleman, President 1967-77; labor economist; author of Blue-Collar Journal; host of CBS program "Money Talks", later president of the Edna McConnell Clark Foundation
Edward Drinker Cope, A.M. (Hon.) 1864, professor of zoology, 1864-67; renowned paleontologist, herpetologist and ichthyologist; long associated with Philadelphia's Academy of Natural Sciences
William C. Davidon, professor of physics and mathematics (1961–1991); peace and justice activist
Elihu Grant, writer, professor of Biblical literature (1917–1938)
Elaine Tuttle Hansen, provost of Haverford College 1995–2002; president of Bates College in Lewiston, Maine
Louise Holland (1893–1990), academic, philologist and archaeologist
Anita Isaacs, Benjamin Collins Professor of Social Sciences; professor of political science
Rufus Jones, professor of philosophy (1893–1934); Quaker mystic; co-founder of American Friends Service Committee
Roger Lane, Benjamin R. Collins Research Professor in history; winner of the Bancroft Award from Columbia University and the Best Book Award from the Urban History Association
Ira De Augustine Reid, professor and chair of sociology and anthropology and first tenured black faculty member (1948–1966), scholar of black urban and immigrant life in the United States 
Michael Sells, guest professor of comparative religions at Haverford (1984–2005); author of Approaching the Qur'an: The Early Revelations; Barrows Professor of Islamic History and Literature at the Divinity School of the University of Chicago
Ed Sikov '78, film scholar and author of Mr. Strangelove: A Biography of Peter Sellers and On Sunset Boulevard: The Life and Times of Billy Wilder. For a decade during the 1990s and 2000s he taught "Sex and Gender on Film: Screwballs, Devil Dames, and Closet Cases", then one of the most popular courses on campus
Douglas V. Steere , professor of philosophy (1928 to 1964); organized Quaker post-war relief work in Finland, Norway and Poland; invited to participate as an ecumenical observer in the Second Vatican Council
Ronald F. Thiemann, chairman of Religion (1975–1985), dean of Harvard Divinity School (1986–1998)
Josiah ("Tink") Thompson, professor of philosophy (1965–1976); biographer and scholar of Søren Kierkegaard; expert on assassination of John F. Kennedy (author of Six Seconds in Dallas (1967) and Last Second in Dallas (2021); left academia to become a private investigator in San Francisco; author of memoir Gumshoe''
Cornel West, assistant professor of Philosophy (1987–88), currently professor of religion at Princeton University
Elisabeth Young-Bruehl, author and psychoanalyst, former student and biographer of Hannah Arendt
Sorelle Friedler, Assistant Director for Data and Democracy in the Whitehouse Office of Science and Technology Policy

References

Haverford College people